Robert Wharton or Warton may refer to:

Robert Wharton, 16th-century Bishop of Hereford
Robert Wharton (Philadelphia) (1757–1834), mayor of Philadelphia, Pennsylvania
Robert Warton (abbot) or Parfew (died 1557), English Benedictine abbot
Robert Warton (umpire) (1847–1923), cricket umpire
Robert Wharton (priest) (1751–1808), Archdeacon of Stow